This is a list of notable people who studied at the Royal Central School of Speech and Drama in London.

A 

 Joss Ackland
 Rodney Ackland
 Razaaq Adoti
 Naana Agyei-Ampadu
 Riz Ahmed
 Hajaz Akram
 Wendy Allnutt
 Joe Alwyn
 Katie Amess
 Gene Anderson
 Nonso Anozie
 Peggy Ashcroft
 Juliet Aubrey

B 

 Paul Bailey
 Rae Baker
 Patrick Baladi
 Jill Balcon
 Ben Baldwin
 Elliot Barnes-Worrell
 Anthony Bate
 Gina Beck
 Michael Beck
 Elizabeth Bell
 Lynda Bellingham
 John Bennett
 Joseph A. Bennett
 Emily Bevan
 Haley Bishop
 Dorothy Black
 Jasmine Blackborow
 Christopher Blake
 Claudie Blakley
 Claire Bloom
 Domini Blythe
 Catherine Bohart
 Adebayo Bolaji
 James Bolam
 Tony Boncza
 Gary Bond
 Philip Bond
 Bette Bourne
 Zoe Boyle
 Betsy Brantley
 James Bree
 Jeremy Brett
 Sally Bretton
 Tim Brinton
 Tom Brittney
 Fern Britton
 Dorothy Bromiley
 Ben Browder
 Ian Brown
 Francesca Buller
 Alex Bulmer
 Jessie Burton
 Michelle Butterly
 Georgia Byng

C 

 Michael Cacoyannis
 Selina Cadell
 Phyllis Calvert
 Gavin Campbell
 Anita Carey
 Peter Chelsom
 Oliver Chris
 Julie Christie
 Jeremy Clyde
 Lucy Cohu
 Maurice Colbourne
 Pauline Collins
 Kenneth Connor
 Giles Cooper
 Shane Cortese
 George Coulouris
 Claire Cox
 Wendy Craig
 Heather Craney
 Anna Cropper
 Tim Crouch
 Lizzie Cundy

D 

 Ryan Davies
 Peter Davison
 Gregory de Polnay
 Jeffery Dench
 Judi Dench
 Sandra Dickinson
 Shaun Dingwall
 Sebastian Doggart
 Amanda Donohoe
 Katharine Doré
 Lindsay Duncan
 Lord David Dundas
 Hilary Dwyer

E 

 Christopher Eccleston
 Jennifer Ehle
 Janet Ellis
 Michael Elphick
 Polly Elwes
 Barry Evans
 Monica Evans
 Robert Evans
 Rupert Everett
 Clive Exton

F 

 Lourdes Faberes
 James Farrar
 James Faulkner
 Abi Finley
 Jonathan Firth
 Carrie Fisher
 Alison Fiske
 Mark Fleischmann
 Jerome Flynn
 Barry Foster
 Michael Fox
 William Fox
 James Frain
 Martin Freeman
 Dawn French
 Sonia Friedman

G 

 Gael García Bernal
 Alexia Gardner
 Andrew Garfield
 Chris Gascoyne
 Richard Gibson
 Philip Glenister
 Jamie Glover
 Nickolas Grace
 Michael Grandage
 Deborah Grant
 Patricia Greene
 Rosamund Greenwood
 Selina Griffiths
 Paul Groothuis
 Hermione Gulliford
 Jack Gwillim

H 

 Kenneth Haigh
 Suzanna Hamilton
 Jake Harders
 Ben Hardy 
 David Hargreaves
 Kit Harington
 Jared Harris
 Ryan Hawley
 Karen Hayley
 Cherry Healey
 Ian Hendry
 Jennifer Hennessy
 Kate Hennig
 Marie Herbert
 Ian Hogg
 David Horovitch
 William Houston
 Colin Hurley

IJ 

 Martins Imhangbe
 Polly Irvin
 Jason Isaacs
 Ana Inés Jabares-Pita
 Ann Jellicoe
 Hannah John-Kamen
 Caroline John
 Cush Jumbo

K 

 Rose Keegan
 Pat Keen
 Jane Kelly
 Jeremy Kemp
 Jonathan Kent
 Annette Kerr
 Pat Keysell
 Delena Kidd
 Geoffrey Kirkness
 Jules Knight
 Will Knightley
 Alice Krige

L 

 Elise Lamb
 Paula Lane
 John Laurie
 Helen Lederer
 Anna Lee
 Olivia Lee
 Alison Leggatt
 David Leland
 Rebecca Lenkiewicz
 Matthew Jay Lewis
 Gabriella Licudi
 Jennie Linden
 Rebecca Lock
 Robert Longden
 Jon Lord
 Cherie Lunghi
 John Lynch
 Susan Lynch
 David Lyon
 Ariel Lin

M 

 Angus Macfadyen
 Vivian MacKerrell
 Anna Mackmin
 Anna Madeley
 Tamzin Malleson
 Sarah Manners
 Amy Manson
 Joseph Marcell
 Freddy Marks
 Joshua Matheson
 Eleanor Matsuura
 Melina Matthews
 Irene Mawer
 Richard Mayes
 Colin McCormack
 Andrew McCulloch
 Virginia McKenna
 Neil McPherson
 Siobhan McSweeney
 Leonie Mellinger
 Jane Menelaus
 Camille Mitchell
 Helen Montagu
 Lucy Montgomery
 Stephen Moore
 Richard Morant
 Diana Morgan
 Joseph Morgan
 Adam Morris
 Alexander Morton
 Aoife Mulholland
 Patrick Mynhardt

N 

 Robin Nedwell
 Kate Nelligan
 James Nesbitt
 Hannah New
 Jonathan Newth
 David Nicholls
 Phoebe Nicholls
 Rosemary Nicols
 Graham Norton

O 

 Tracy Ann Oberman
 Ita O'Brien
 David O'Hara
 Patrick O'Kane
 Laurence Olivier
 James Ottaway
 Indra Ové
 John Owen-Jones
 David Oxley

PQ 

 Rachel Parris
 Richard Pasco
 Tom Payne
 Tessa Peake-Jones
 Neil Pearson
 Stjepan Perić
 Mouche Phillips
 Harold Pinter
 Morgane Polanski
 Ben Price
 James Purefoy
 Moira Quirk

R 

 Anthony Read
 Lynn Redgrave
 Vanessa Redgrave
 Enn Reitel
 Emma Relph
 Katrina Retallick
 Julian Rhind-Tutt
 Natasha Richardson
 Michael Ripper
 Linus Roache
 Bruce Robinson
 Tony Robinson
 Patsy Rodenburg
 Rebecca Root
 George Rose
 Finn Ross
 Dominic Rowan
 Julia Roy
 Catherine Russell

S 

 Pamela Salem
 Julian Sands
 Jennifer Saunders
 Lucy Scott
 Kristin Scott Thomas
 Heather Sears
 Andy Secombe
 Nicholas Selby
 Rufus Sewell
 Jack Shepherd
 Josette Simon
 Susan Skipper
 Mina Smallman
 Liz Solari
 Karla Souza
 Claire Stansfield
 Emma Stansfield
 Carol Starks
 Nathan Stewart-Jarrett
 Sara Stewart

T 

 Zoë Tapper
 Catherine Tate
 Mandala Tayde
 Beryl Te Wiata
 Victoria Tennant
 Karl Theobald
 Siân Thomas
 Kim Thomson
 Christopher Timothy
 Abi Titmuss
 Ann Todd
 Stephen Tompkinson
 Kathleen Turner

UV 

 Mary Ure
 John Van Eyssen
 Tasha de Vasconcelos
 Paul Venables
 Wanda Ventham
 Deepak Verma
 Richard Vernon

WXYZ 

 Julian Wadham
 Gok Wan
 Zoë Wanamaker
 Lalla Ward
 Michael Ward
 Deborah Warner
 Timothy Watson
 Kevin Whately
 Frances White
 Debbie Wilcox, Baroness Wilcox of Newport
 Finty Williams
 Julia Wilson-Dickson
 Mary Wimbush
 Frank Windsor
 Duncan Wisbey
 Irene Worth
 Angus Wright
 Stewart Wright
 Alexis Zegerman

References

Royal Central School of Speech and Drama